Hristo Smolenov is a Bulgarian scientist, logician and antiterrorism expert, born 1954 in Plovdiv, Bulgaria. In 2007 was revealed as associated with the communist secret services.

Academic career
After graduating from the Moscow State University he became a guest professor at the University of Montreal and at the Catholic University of America in Washington.  He is an associate professor at the Bulgarian Academy of Sciences. As a specialist in logic and methodology of science he has long been involved in creative solutions in non-standard situations.

Books and publications

 Codes in Space, 2016
 Zagora - Varna - the hidden super-culture, 2012
 The Lost Aurolithic Civilization? Codes from a Black Sea Atlantis, 2010
 Self-Producing Terror, 2005
 The Market Life of Global Terrorism, 2004
 The Cannibals Paradox: Global Terrorism and Hyper-Capital, 2003
 Struktur und Dynamik wissenschaftlicher Theorien: Beiträge zur Wissenschaftsgeschichte und Wissenschaftstheorie aus der bulgarischen Forschung, 1990
 Zeno's paradoxes and temporal becoming in dialectical atomism, 1984 
 Truthfulness and non-trivial contradiction, 1984

Political career
Smolenov initiated the creation of Independent Society of Ecoglasnost in 1988, which later became a founding member of the umbrella opposition movement Union of Democratic Forces. Between 1995-1997 he was the Parliamentary Secretary of the Bulgarian Ministry of Defense. In 1999 Smolenov was elected for MP in the 38th Bulgarian National Assembly.

Awards and achievements
In 2017 Smolenov was honored with the title Honorary Professor of the Nikola Vaptsarov Naval Academy.

References

Bulgarian scientists